Abhishek Verma (born 1 August 1989) is an Indian sport shooter. In 2019 Beijing he won a gold medal in the Men's 10 metre air pistol. At 2018 Jakarta Palembang he won a bronze medal in Men's 10 metre air pistol. Verma is slated to participate from the Indian contingent in Japan Olympics 2021 and has started preparations. Verma is currently ranked 1 in the 10m Air Pistol category.

A double gold medallist at World Cup, and he holds a BTech in computer science, wants to deal with cases related to cyber crime. He  grabbed his second gold medal at the Rio de Janeiro World Cup in August.

References

External links
 
 
 

1989 births
Living people
Indian male sport shooters
ISSF pistol shooters
Asian Games medalists in shooting
Shooters at the 2018 Asian Games
Asian Games bronze medalists for India
Medalists at the 2018 Asian Games
Olympic shooters of India
Shooters at the 2020 Summer Olympics
Recipients of the Arjuna Award
21st-century Indian people